The Lusaka Open was a men's professional golf tournament played at Lusaka Golf Club in Zambia between 1969 and 1979. It was one of three Zambian events on the Safari Circuit schedule.

The event pre-dated the Zambia Open which was first contested in 1972. The Lusaka Golf Club first hosted the Zambia Open in 1973 and again in 1976, 1978 and annually from 1980 to 1993. The Lusaka Open was not held in those years. The event went under a variety of names being called the Lusaka Dunlop Open in 1970 and 1971 and the Eagle Open in 1969 and 1974.

The 1974 event was reduced to 54 holes because of bad weather.

Winners

References

Safari Circuit events
Golf tournaments in Zambia
Recurring sporting events established in 1969
Recurring sporting events disestablished in 1979
1969 establishments in Zambia